The 2005–06 Volvo Ocean Race was held between 5 November 2005 and 17 June 2006. Seven boats took part in the race and made ten stops in nine countries.

The 2005–06 race was the first to not begin in the United Kingdom.
A new class of boat, the Volvo Open 70 was introduced: The new boats were 2m longer and about 1,000 kg lighter than the VO60's used in the previous race. They were also allowed to have more sail area and include the use of canting keels.

During Leg 7 of the race, Hans Horrevoets, 32, of the Netherlands was swept overboard from ABN AMRO II. Although he was recovered from the water, attempts to resuscitate him were not successful. CPR was stopped at 0420GMT, 18 May 2006.

The crew of Movistar abandoned ship after the aft end of their keel pivot broke away from their hull in the night of 20 May 2006, and transferred to ABN AMRO II which had been standing by and was escorted by  back to land. Although a search was carried out for the yacht, it is believed she sank due to the damage sustained.

The 2005–06 race had tighter restrictions on the number of crewmembers allowed than previous races. An all-male crew was restricted to ten, while a crew with at least 5 women could have eleven members, and an all-female crew, (of which there were none in the race), could have twelve. The only woman who served as crew was Adrienne Cahalan of Brasil 1, who was replaced after the first leg. The skipper of each team could nominate one additional person for the in-port races.

In early 2005 Volvo released a limited model called the V70 Ocean Race Edition and the XC90 Ocean Race Edition.

Participants

Route

Leg Results

In-Port Race Results

Overall Results

References

External links
Ocean Race Chesapeake
QTVR fullscreen panoramas of VO70 Ericsson Racing Team boat
Race results
2005–06 Volvo Ocean Race official film

The Ocean Race
Volvo Ocean Race, 2005-06
Volvo Ocean Race, 2005-06
2006 in New Zealand sport